Arjun Gaurang Yodh is an American physicist. He is the James M. Skinner Professor of Science at the University of Pennsylvania and former Director of the Laboratory for Research on the Structure of Matter.

Early life and education
Yodh was born and raised in Maryland to Indian immigrant parents. Growing up, his father, a physicist, greatly attracted him to the field. While attending Springbrook High School, Yodh was the runner-up for the best scientific paper at the annual Maryland Junior Science and Humanities Symposium. Following high school, Yodh earned his Bachelor of Science degree at Cornell University and his PhD from Harvard University. As a graduate student at Harvard, Yodh worked with Tom Mossberg and completed a two-year postdoctoral fellowship at AT&T Bell Laboratories.

Career
Following his fellowship, Yodh joined the faculty at the University of Pennsylvania as an assistant professor of physics with a plan to use lasers to study molecules on surfaces. During his early time at UPenn, Yodh focused his research interests on aspects of chemical, condensed-matter, and optical physics. He also received the Office of Naval Research Navy Young Investigator Award and was an Alfred P. Sloan Research Fellow from 1991 to 1994 and earned an Presidential Young Investigator Award. In 1997, he was appointed the William Smith Term Professor and James M. Skinner Professor of Science in 2000. Prior to his secondary appointment, Yodh was elected a Fellow of the American Physical Society for his "work on the use of diffusing light fields and studies of the structural, dynamical, and spectroscopic properties of highly scattering materials." He also pioneered the use of diffuse optics as a tool for medical diagnostics, such as imaging of breast tumors and functional imaging and spectroscopy of the brain. His research also helped to discover what pattern a tumor creates.

As the James M. Skinner Professor of Science, Yodh found that sodium dodecylbenzene sulfonate (NaDDBS) disperses nanotubes in water with high efficiency. The result of this discovery improved scientists ability to manipulate single nanotubes. He also employed optical techniques, such as laser tweezers and confocal microscopy, for the study of interactions and phase behavior of soft-matter systems. In 2009, Yodh was appointed the director of the Laboratory for Research on the Structure of Matter (LRSM) at the University of Pennsylvania. In his first term as director, Yodh oversaw the renewal of the $22 million National Science Foundation Materials Research Science and Engineering Center award, the largest one nationwide. As well, he led the development of numerous educational outreach programs. As such, Yodh was re-appointed the LRSM director in 2014. During his second term as director, Yodh also served as a member at various UPenn institutes, including the Institute of Medicine and Engineering, the Bioengineering Graduate Group, and the Abramson Cancer Center. In 2016, he was the recipient of the Alexander von Humboldt Foundation’s Humboldt Research Award and, in 2017, was one of two UPenn professors who were elected Fellows of the American Association for the Advancement of Science (AAAS).

In 2021, Yodh was elected into the American Institute for Medical and Biological Engineering for "pioneering pre-clinical and clinical contributions to the development of diffuse optics for imaging and monitoring tissue physiology." He was also awarded the 2021 Michael S. Feld Biophotonics Award from The Optical Society.

References

External links

Living people
Scientists from Maryland
21st-century American physicists
University of Pennsylvania faculty
Cornell University College of Engineering alumni
Harvard University alumni
Fellows of the American Physical Society
Fellows of the American Institute for Medical and Biological Engineering
Fellows of the American Association for the Advancement of Science
Year of birth missing (living people)